Abbreviations: ch = children's; d = drama, screenwriting; f = fiction; nf = non-fiction; p = poetry, song lyrics

List of authors by name:

A – B –
C – D –
E – F –
G – H –
I – J –
K – L –
M – N –
O – P –
Q – R –
S – T –
U – V –
W – X –
Y – Z

Q